Israel national lacrosse team may refer to:

 Israel men's national lacrosse team
 Israel women's national lacrosse team